Ernest Henri Dubois (March 16, 1863 in Dieppe; December 30, 1930 in Paris), was a French sculptor. He enrolled in 1881 at the École des Arts décoratiif and then attended the École des Beaux-Arts in Paris where he studied under Alexandre Falguière, Henri Chapu and Jules Chaplain.  It was his award of the commission to carry out the sculptural work on the tomb of Jacques-Bénigne Bossuet in Meaux Cathedral that gave his career a boost and saw him awarded a Medal of Honour and subsequently he became a Chevalier de la Légion d'honneur.

Works

Dubois also designed several public monuments erected in Romania: 
 Monument to Ion C. Brătianu in Bucharest.
 Monument to George C. Cantacuzino, at Grădina Icoanei.
 Monument to George D. Pallade.
 Monument to Eugeniu Carada in Bucharest.
 Monument to Take Ionescu.
 Bust of Ion Brătianu.
Some of these monuments were destroyed during the Communist period.

Gallery

References 

19th-century French sculptors
French male sculptors
20th-century French sculptors
Chevaliers of the Légion d'honneur
École des Beaux-Arts alumni
1863 births
1930 deaths
19th-century French male artists